Super-Rabbit is a 1943 Warner Bros. cartoon starring Bugs Bunny. The cartoon is a parody of the popular comic book and radio character Superman by DC Comics. Super-Rabbit was the 16th Bugs Bunny entry, and the 47th directed by Chuck Jones.

Plot 
Professor Cannafraz (a Richard Haydn impression) creates a "super carrot" and uses it on his test subject – Rabbitus idioticus americanus (Bugs Bunny), who immediately consumes the proffered carrot. Armed with temporary superhero abilities that need to be replenished with additional super carrots, Bugs remembers a newspaper article about Texas hunter "Cottontail" Smith, who wants to exterminate all rabbits.

Bugs, adorned in a superhero costume complete with cape, flies to Deepinaharta, Texas, and assumes the guise of a mild-mannered forest creature by  wearing oversized reading glasses and a hat. He encounters Smith, who attempts to shoot Bugs, only for the bullets to form an outline of the rabbit before harmlessly falling to the ground. Bugs then hands Smith a cannon, eats another super carrot as a precaution, then, upon being struck by the cannonball, plays basketball with it, quickly shoving Smith and his horse onto bleachers while he acts as his own cheerleader. After Bugs returns to the sky, the bemused Smith and his horse follow   the rabbit in an airplane. Using his super powers, Bugs then snatches the shell of the plane away from them, plunging Smith and the horse to the ground.

Cruising through the sky, Bugs begins to run out of power, but when he tries to recharge again, he accidentally drops his carrots and he falls to the ground. After Bugs lands, he opens his eyes to see a line of chewed carrot tops eaten by Smith and his horse-turned-Superhero, both wearing cape and costume. Bugs turns to the camera and says "This looks like a job for a REAL Superman!" He ducks into a phone booth. Both Smith and the horse are ready to attack – until the booth opens and they both snap to attention and salute. Bugs marches out in a Marine uniform, singing the "Marines' Hymn." He dismisses the two, claiming he has "important work to do!", and marches off to "Berlin, Tokyo and points East."

Reception 
The U.S. Marine Corps were so thrilled that Bugs Bunny decided to become a Marine in this cartoon that they insisted the character be officially inducted into the force as a private, which was done, complete with dogtags. The character was regularly promoted until Bugs was officially "discharged" at the end of World War II as a Master Sergeant.

Cottontail Smith later appears as one of Yosemite Sam’s sidekicks in Looney Tunes: Back in Action. The character’s voice is a less raucous version of Sam’s and Foghorn Leghorn’s.

Analysis 
The cartoon parodies the Max Fleischer Superman animated shorts as a figure soars across the sky from random directions. Onlookers are heard speculating on its nature: "Look! Up there in the sky" "It’s a boid" [bird], "Nah, it ain’t a boid, it’s a dive-bommah".

A Marine is described  as "a real superman" by Bugs.

Home media
VHS – Bugs Bunny Cartoon Festival featuring "Hold the Lion, Please"
VHS and Laserdisc – Bugs and Daffy: The Wartime Cartoons
VHS – Bugs Bunny On Parade
VHS – Looney Tunes Collectors Edition: Running Amuck
Laserdisc – The Golden Age of Looney Tunes Volume 3
 DVD – Looney Tunes Golden Collection: Volume 3
 DVD – Superman: The Ultimate Collection

Sources

References

External links 

1943 comedy films
1943 short films
1943 animated films
1940s animated short films
1940s animated superhero films
Short films directed by Chuck Jones
Films set in Texas
American superhero comedy films
American World War II propaganda shorts
American animated science fiction films
Merrie Melodies short films
Warner Bros. Cartoons animated short films
Films about the United States Marine Corps
Parody superheroes
Fictional United States Marine Corps personnel
Superman in other media
American black-and-white films
Films scored by Carl Stalling
Bugs Bunny films
Parodies of Superman
Films produced by Leon Schlesinger
1940s Warner Bros. animated short films
American science fiction comedy films